Phillip Jacob Robbins (born May 23, 1976) is a former Major League Baseball pitcher who ended his career in the Chicago White Sox organization.

The only run he gave up was a solo home run by Jacque Jones on September 24 of that year. His earned run average was 5.40. In , he pitched for the White Sox Triple-A affiliate, the Charlotte Knights, in Fort Mill, South Carolina. Robbins was 0-0 in 20 games, with an ERA of 5.11 and 14 strikeouts in 24⅔ innings.

He currently runs the Jake Robbins Pitching School at Showecase Baseball Academy.

External links

1976 births
Living people
Major League Baseball pitchers
Cleveland Indians players
Baseball players from Charlotte, North Carolina
Gulf Coast Yankees players
Oneonta Yankees players
Greensboro Bats players
Tampa Yankees players
Columbus Clippers players
Richmond Braves players
Colorado Springs Sky Sox players
Akron Aeros players
Buffalo Bisons (minor league) players
Louisville Bats players
Charlotte Knights players